Action on Rights for Children (ARCH) was an Internet-based not-for-profit children’s rights organisation in the United Kingdom established in 2001 with a particular focus on civil rights and liberties. ARCH works for the advancement of children’s human rights, conducts research and publishes information, and promotes the recognition by policy makers of their obligations to children under existing human rights instruments.  The company was dissolved on 27 May 2014.

External links
Action on Rights for Children
The ARCH Blog
The Arch Blog (Old)
Database Masterclass — A blog run by ARCH focusing on databases

Children's rights organisations in the United Kingdom
Organizations established in 2001
Non-profit organisations based in the United Kingdom